The 2017 Washington Kastles season will be the tenth season of the franchise in World TeamTennis (WTT).

Season recap

Drafts
At the WTT Marquee Player Draft on February 16, 2017, the Kastles protected Martina Hingis, Venus Williams and Bob and Mike Bryan. Mardy Fish was left unprotected and was drafted by the New York Empire with the first pick of the third round.

Event chronology
 February 16, 2017: The Kastles protected Martina Hingis, Venus Williams and Bob and Mike Bryan at the WTT Marquee Player Draft. The Kastles left Mardy Fish unprotected.

Draft picks
After finishing third in WTT in 2016, the Kastles selected fourth in each round of WTT's drafts.

Marquee Player Draft
WTT conducted its 2017 Marquee Player Draft in New York City on February 16. The selections made by the Kastles are shown in the table below.

See also

 Sports in Washington, D.C.

References

External links
Washington Kastles official website
World TeamTennis official website

Washington Kastles season
Washington Kastles